High School of Telecommunication Arts and Technology is a public high school in Bay Ridge, Brooklyn.It was established in the 1980s with a focus on preparing students for careers working with computers, including by teaching about word processing and databases. It has a software engineering program that is based around the CS4ALL curriculum.

It is located at 350 67th Street, Brooklyn, NY 11220. It has 1300 students.

The school is a Gothic style building. It was formerly Bay Ridge High School. As Bay Ridge High school, it was all girls, but it is now coed.

In 2016, the building established a rooftop greenhouse for teaching about botany and food production.

Notable alumni
Josh Palacios, baseball player
Taj Gibson, basketball player

References

External links

 

Gothic Revival architecture in New York City
Telecommunication education
Public high schools in Brooklyn